Mukhtaṣar, in Islamic law,   refers to a concise handbook of legal treatises, characterized by neatness and clarity. Mukhtasars originated during the Abbasid caliphate and were created as a method to facilitate the quick training of lawyers without the repetitiveness of lengthy volumes, yet evolved into a mode of access into the fundamentals of Islamic law for the educated layperson. Some well-known mukhtasars include the Mukhtasar of Khalil, by the Egyptian Maliki scholar Khalil ibn Ishaq al-Jundi (died 1365), and the Mukhtasar al-Quduri, by Hanafi scholar Imam al-Quduri (973-1037) of Baghdad.

Ibn Abī Zamanīn
The Mukhtasar of Ibn Abī Zamanīn was one of the five great commentary manuscripts in the personal library of Ludovico Maracci that helped inform 18th Century Europe about Islam.

Notes

Arabic words and phrases in Sharia
Islamic terminology
Sharia legal terminology